Christiane Paul is chief curator/director of the Sheila C. Johnson Design Center at Parsons School of Design and Professor of Media Studies at The New School, and Adjunct Curator of New Media Arts at the Whitney Museum of American Art in New York City. She is widely known as the author of the book Digital Art, part of the 'World of Art' series published by Thames & Hudson.

Education 
Paul received both her MA and PhD from the University of Düsseldorf in  North Rhine-Westphalia, Germany.

Career 
Paul has written extensively on digital art and lectured internationally on art and technology.

Paul has previously taught in the MFA computer arts department at the School of Visual Arts in New York (1999–2008); the Digital+Media Department of the Rhode Island School of Design (2005–08); the San Francisco Art Institute and the Center of New Media at the University of California at Berkeley (2008).

In 2016, Paul was the recipient of the Thoma Foundation Arts Writing Award in Digital Art for an established arts writer who has made significant contributions to the intersection of art and technology. In 2018, Paul was a speaker at the Chicago New Media Symposium which was held as part of the Chicago New Media 1973–1992 Exhibition. The Exhibition was curated by jonCates.

Paul is currently a Professor of Media Studies at The New School  and Director/Chief Curator of Sheila C. Johnson Design Center

Publications 
 A Companion to Digital Art, Wiley-Blackwell, April 2016, Hoboken, NJ
 Digital Art, 'World of Art' series, Thames & Hudson, UK, 3rd revised ed. 2015 (1st edition 2003; 2nd revised edition 2008)
 Chinese Edition: Context Providers — Conditions of Meaning in Media Arts (Beijing Beepub Media & Culture Publishing Co., Ltd: Beijing, 2012)
 Context Providers — Conditions of Meaning in Media Arts, co-editor with Margot Lovejoy and Victoria Vesna, Intellect Press, UK / University of Chicago Press, 2011
 New Media in the White Cube and Beyond – Curatorial Models for Digital Art, editor, UC California Press, 2008
 telematic landscape / Telematische Landschaft, editor, Verlag Walther König, Cologne, Germany, 1999
 Unreal City, A Hypertext Companion to T.S. Eliot's The Waste Land, Storyspace hypertext software, Cambridge, MA: Eastgate Systems, Inc., 1995
 Die Antizipation der amerikanischen Postmoderne im Romanwerk Herman Melvilles / The Anticipation of Postmodern American Fiction in the Novels of Herman Melville [Dissertation], Idstein, Germany: Schulz-Kirchner Verlag, 1988

Awards, fellowships and residencies 
 2016: Recipient of the Thoma Foundation’s 2016 Arts Writing Award in Digital Art
(Established Category)
 2014: Residency at the David Bermant Foundation, Santa Ynez, CA
 2013: Dora Maar Fellow in Residence, Dora Maar House, Menerbes, France
 2005 – 2007: Cassullo Fellow, Independent Study Program, Whitney Museum

Exhibitions curated 

2018
 Programmed: Rules, Codes, and Choreographies in Art, 1965–2018, The Whitney Museum of American Art (09/28/18 – 04/14/19)
2013
 The Public Private – Sheila Johnson Design Center, Kellen Gallery, The New School (02/06 – 04/17)
 America's Got No Talent – Jonah Brucker Cohen and Katherine Moriwaki, artport, Whitney Museum of American Art (02/13 – present)
 Light and Dark Networks – Ursula Endlicher, Sunset / Sunrise series, artport, Whitney Museum of American Art (12/15 – present)
 The Assignment Book – a project by Luis Camnitzer, co-curated with Trebor Scholz, Arnold and Sheila Aronson Galleries, The New School (09/21 – 10/16)
 Cory Arcangel: Pro Tools – Whitney Museum of American Art (05/26 – 09/11)
 CLICKISTAN by Ubermorgen.com – online game, Whitney Museum of American Art (12/12 – present)
 Eduardo Kac: Lagoglyphs, Biotopes and Transgenic Works – Oi Futuro, Rio de Janeiro, Brazil (01/25 – 03/30)
2009
 Artistic Director, 3rd Biennale Quadrilaterale –  Rijeka, Croatia (12/08 – 01/16/10)
 FEEDFORWARD – The Angel of History – Laboral Art Center, Gijon, Spain; co-curated with Steve Dietz (10/22 – 04/05)
 Incheon Digital Art Festival INDAF – Incheon, Korea; co-curated with Hye Kyung Shin and Gerfried Stocker (08/07 – 10/25)
2008	
 SOS 4.8 Festival – Murcia, Spain; Co-curator (05/02 – 05/04)
2007	
 Profiling – Whitney Museum of American Art (06/08 – 09/09)
 Feedback – Laboral Center for Art and Industrial Creation, Gijon, Spain; Co-curator  (03/30 – 06/30)
2006	* Translations: Misguided Machines and Cultural Loops – Selected Works by Students of the Design+Media Dept., RISD, Emergence at DUO Theater, NYC (11/04 – 11/26)
 Second Natures – Eli & Edythe Broad Art Center, UCLA, Los Angeles, CA (09/13 – 10/26)
 ARCO Blackbox – ARCO ART Fair, Madrid, Spain; Co-curator (02/08 – 02/12)
2005-06
 Follow Through – A Mobile Media Project, Whitney Museum of American Art (12/01 – 01/29)
2004	
 The Passage of Mirage – Chelsea Art Museum; public program of Intelligent Agent; Co-curator (09/14 – 10/16)
 Evident Traces – Ciberarts Festival, Bilbao, Spain (04/23 – 04/30)
 eVolution – Art Interactive Gallery, Boston (01/23 – 04/11)
2003	
 CODeDOC II – the Ars Electronica Festival in Linz, Austria (09/06 – 09/11)
 Vectors: Digital Art of Our Time – 10th anniversary exhibition of the New York Digital Salon, World Financial Center, NYC; Co-curator (04/22 – 05/25)
2002	
 CODeDOC – online exhibition at the Whitney's artport site (09/16 – present)
Mapping Transitions – a net art exhibition and forum at the University of Colorado, Boulder; Co-curator and organizer, with Mark Amerika (09/13 – 09/15)
 2002 Whitney Biennial, Net Art Selection (03/07 – 05/26)
 Re-Media — Net Art Selection for the 2002 Fotofest Biennial (03/01 – 04/01)
2001	
 Net Art Selection for EVO1, Gallery L, Moscow, Russia (10/04 – 10/25)
 Data Dynamics — Exhibition of Net Art, Whitney Museum  (03/22 – 06/10)

References

Addition sources 
Bruce Wands, Art of the Digital Age, London: Thames & Hudson 2006
Ian Chilvers & John Glaves-Smith, A Dictionary of Modern and Contemporary Art. Oxford University Press 2009
Lieser Wolf. Digital Art. Langenscheidt: h.f. ullmann. 2009
Sarah Cook, Verina Gfader, Beryl Graham and Axel Lapp (eds), A Brief History of Curating New Media Art, Berlin: The Green Box 2010

External links 
 Eyebeam people
 Art Digital Magazine podcast interview (2011)
 Intelligent Agent
 transliteracies project
 Super Atari Poetry
 Interview with Christiane Paul
 Preserving New Media by Christiane Paul

American art critics
American art historians
Women art historians
Living people
Postmodernists
Cultural historians
The New School faculty
Mass media theorists
American art curators
American women curators
American women historians
People associated with the Whitney Museum of American Art
Year of birth missing (living people)
21st-century American women